Barclay Martin (December 17, 1802 – November 8, 1890) was an American politician and a member of the United States House of Representatives for Tennessee's 6th congressional district.

Biography
Martin was born in Edgefield County, South Carolina on December 17, 1802. He moved to Bourbon County, Kentucky with his parents in 1804 and to Bedford County, Tennessee in 1806. He pursued an academic course and moved to Columbia, Tennessee in Maury County. He studied law, was admitted to the bar, and began his practice.

Career
In 1839 and 1840, Martin was a member of the Tennessee House of Representatives, and he served in the Tennessee Senate from 1841 to 1843.

Elected as a member of the Democratic Party to the Twenty-ninth Congress, Martin served from March 4, 1845 to March 3, 1847.  He resumed the practice of his profession and again served in the Tennessee House of Representatives from 1847 to 1849 and from 1851 to 1853. He was a member of the board of trustees of the Columbia Athenaeum, which served as the rectory for the Columbia Female Institute, from 1852 until his death.

Death
Martin died in Columbia, Tennessee on November 8, 1890 and is interred at Zion Cemetery.

References

External links

1802 births
1890 deaths
Democratic Party members of the Tennessee House of Representatives
Democratic Party Tennessee state senators
Democratic Party members of the United States House of Representatives from Tennessee
19th-century American politicians